The Wake County Board of Commissioners is the governing board for Wake County, which includes the City of Raleigh.

As of the 2020 census, the population of Wake County was 1,115,000 making it North Carolina's most populated county. Its county seat is Raleigh, which is also the state capital. Wake County is part of the Research Triangle metropolitan region, which encompasses the cities of Raleigh, Durham, Cary and Chapel Hill and their surrounding suburban areas. The regional name originated after the 1959 creation of the Research Triangle Park, located midway between Raleigh and Durham. The Research Triangle region encompasses the U.S. Census Bureau's Combined Statistical Area (CSA) of Raleigh-Durham-Cary. The estimated population of the Raleigh-Durham-Cary CSA was 1,749,525 as of April 1, 2010, with the Raleigh-Cary Metropolitan Statistical Area (MSA) portion at 1,130,490 residents in 2020 census.

Wake County was the 9th fastest growing county in the United States, with the Town of Cary and the City of Raleigh being the 8th and 15th fastest growing cities, respectively. It is presided over by the County Board Chairman.

Composition

Current commissioners 
This is a list of the Wake County Commissioners in order by district. This list is current as of January 2021.

Former commissioners 
Below is a list of notable former members of the Wake County Board of Commissioners with their dates of service:

Lynton Y. Ballentine (1926-1934) - later NC Lieutenant Governor and NC Secretary of Agriculture
Linda Coleman (1998-2002) - later NC House of Representatives member
Vernon Malone (1980–2002) - Educator; also chair of Wake County Board of Education and member of NC Senate
Les Merritt (1994–1998) - later State Auditor of North Carolina
Paul Coble (2006-2014) - previous Mayor of Raleigh, later candidate for Congress
Tony Gurley (2002-2014) - later Chief Operating Officer for the Office of State Budget and Management
Betty Lou Ward (1988-2016) Community volunteer; longest service as Wake County Commissioner 
Jessica Holmes (2014-2018) - Lawyer; 2020 candidate for NC Secretary of Agriculture
John D. Burns (2014-2018) - Lawyer
Greg Ford (2016-2020) - Educator; first out LGBT Wake County elected official

References 

Stan Norwalk (2008-2010)

External links 

 
Wake County Board of Commissioners
Local government in North Carolina